Slow Life may refer to:

In culture:
Slow Living, living in a more balanced, meaningful, and life-affirming way 
Slow movement (culture), a global cultural movement that emphasizes a thoughtful, slower pace in a variety of social areas

In music:
"Slow Life", a 2004 EP by Super Furry Animals
"Slow Life", a song by Grizzly Bear (band)
"Slow Life", a song by Jolin Tsai from Butterfly

In writing:
"Slow Life" (novelette), a science fiction story by Michael Stanwick